Farafina Magazine was a bi-monthly Nigerian magazine published online from 2002, and in print from October 2005, until 2009 by Kachifo Limited. It was a general-interest African magazine that included non-fiction articles alongside fiction pieces and illustrations. 

Guest editors for the magazine included several notable authors such as Chimamanda Ngozi Adichie, Laila Lalami, and Petina Gappah. It published work by writers such as Wole Soyinka, Segun Afolabi, and Jide Alakija.

The magazine was considered important in postcolonial literature for helping lay "the foundations of a pan-African literary network" alongside the Nairobi-based literary magazine Kwani?.

References

2004 establishments in Nigeria
2009 disestablishments in Nigeria
Bi-monthly magazines
Defunct magazines published in Nigeria
Magazines established in 2004
Magazines disestablished in 2009
Magazines published in Nigeria
Publishing in Nigeria